Johann-Heinrich-Merck-Preis is a literary prize of Hesse awarded by the Deutsche Akademie für Sprache und Dichtung since 1964. Since 2013 the prize winner receives €20,000. The award is donated by the Merck Group in memory of the German author and critic Johann Heinrich Merck (1741–1791).

Winners

1964 Günter Blöcker
1965 not awarded
1966 Karl Heinz Ruppel
1967 Werner Weber
1968 Georg Hensel
1969 Erich Heller
1970 Joachim Kaiser
1971 Peter Huchel
1972 Horst Krüger
1973 H. H. Stuckenschmidt
1974 Joachim Günther
1975 Walter Höllerer
1976 Peter Rühmkorf
1977 François Bondy
1978 Karl Heinz Bohrer
1979 Werner Spies
1980 Sebastian Haffner
1981 Hilde Spiel
1982 Albert von Schirnding
1983 Albrecht Schöne
1984 Erwin Chargaff
1985 Sibylle Wirsing
1986 Heinrich Vormweg
1987 Reinhard Baumgart
1988 Ivan Nagel
1989 Lothar Baier
1990 Walter Boehlich
1991 Peter von Matt
1992 
1993 Hans Egon Holthusen
1994 Peter Demetz
1995 Michael Maar
1996 Ulrich Weinzierl
1997 Heinz F. Schafroth
1998 Iso Camartin
1999 Gerhard R. Koch
2000 Silvia Bovenschen
2001 Friedrich Dieckmann
2002 Volker Klotz
2003 Klaus Theweleit
2004 Anita Albus
2005 Hans Keilson
2006 Eduard Beaucamp
2007 Günther Rühle
2008 Lothar Müller
2009 Harald Hartung
2010 Karl-Markus Gauß
2011 Günter de Bruyn
2012 Heinz Schlaffer
2013 Wolfram Schütte
2014 Carolin Emcke
2015 Gabriele Goettle
2016 Kathrin Passig
2017 
2018 
2019 
2020 Iris Radisch
2021 Franz Schuh
2022

References

External links
 

Literary awards of Hesse